Charaghata is a village within the jurisdiction of the Jaynagar police station in the Jaynagar I CD block in the Baruipur subdivision of the South 24 Parganas district in the Indian state of West Bengal.

Geography

Demographics
As per 2011 Census of India, Charaghata had a total population of 5,837.

Transport
A short stretch of local roads link Charaghata to the Gocharan-Dhosa Road.

Gocharan railway station is located nearby.

Healthcare
Padmerhat Rural Hospital, with 30 beds, at Padmerhat, is the major government medical facility in the Jaynagar I CD block.

References

Villages in South 24 Parganas district
Neighbourhoods in Jaynagar Majilpur